Kim Jong-un, current Supreme Leader of North Korea, holds many titles and offices. Currently, he holds the highest titles in the party, state and army, being General Secretary of the Workers' Party of Korea, Chairman of the Central Military Commission of the Workers' Party of Korea, President of the State Affairs of the Democratic People's Republic of Korea and Supreme Commander of the Armed Forces of the Democratic People's Republic of Korea.

Usage in North Korean media
As of 2022, when Kim Jong-un is mentioned in North Korean media and publications, he is most commonly referred to as "Respected Comrade Kim Jong-un", "Respected Comrade General Secretary", or "Marshal". 

Like his grandfather and father, when he is mentioned in North Korean media and publications, it is always accompanied by one of these titles or by just one of these titles. When his name is written, it is always emphasised by a special bold font or in a larger font size, for example: "Respected Comrade  Clarifies Plan to Form Area of Riverside Terraced Houses around Pothong Gate" or "Respected Comrade  Clarifies Plan to Form Area of Riverside Terraced Houses around Pothong Gate."

His honourific titles would be used as a description added to his name or affectionate title. For example, "Comrade Kim Jong Un, who is an outstanding successor and leader of the Juche revolution, the symbol of strength of our state and the banner of all victory and glory," (Korean: 주체혁명의 유일무이한 계승자이시고 령도자이시며 우리 국가의 강대성의 상징이시고 모든 승리와 영광의 기치이신 김정은동지).

List of official titles and offices

Current titles and offices

Previously held offices and titles

List of propagated titles

See also

Held titles 
 General Secretary of the Workers' Party of Korea
 Chairman of the Workers' Party of Korea
 President of the State Affairs Commission of the DPRK
 Chairman of the National Defence Commission of North Korea
 Supreme Commander of the Armed Forces of North Korea

Related 
 List of Kim Il-sung's titles
 List of Kim Jong-il's titles

References 

Kim Jong-un
Kim jong-un
Propaganda in North Korea